Debin is an urban locality (an urban-type settlement) in Yagodninsky District of Magadan Oblast, Russia. Population:

Geography
 upstream is Sinegorye and the Kolyma dam.

History
Debin was founded in 1935 with the creation of a ferry point over the Kolyma, initially under the name Pereprava.  In 1937 it was renamed for the Debin River, which joins the Kolyma a few kilometers upstream from the settlement.  During the era of the Gulag network, it was the base for one of the larger prison camps administered by Dalstroy in the Kolyma region, centred on using forced labour for gold mining.

Infrastructure

Debin is located on the Kolyma Highway, at the point where it crosses the Kolyma River.  From here, roads also lead to Sinegorye and to other smaller localities such as Taskan, Elgen and Verkhny At-Uryakh.

References

Urban-type settlements in Magadan Oblast
Kolyma basin